Alyssa Chia Pheng Boey (born 10 August 1996 in Petaling Jaya) is a Malaysian tennis player.

Boey made her WTA tour debut at the 2014 Malaysian Open, having received a wildcard with Yang Zi into the doubles tournament.

Playing for Malaysia at the Fed Cup, Boey has a win-loss record of 4–5.

References

External links 
 
 
 
 Cornell University profile

1996 births
Living people
Malaysian female tennis players
Malaysian people of Chinese descent
People from Selangor
Cornell Big Red women's tennis players